Martín Lucero (born 23 May 1990) is an Argentine professional footballer who plays as a midfielder for Colegiales.

Career
Lucero's career began with Argentine clubs Sportivo Belgrano and Colegiales, prior to making a move to Brazilian football to sign for Figueirense. He had subsequent spells with Pelotas, Palmeiras, Grêmio Barueri and Sorocaba. He returned to Argentine football in 2013 to join former club Sportivo Belgrano, who were now playing in Primera B Nacional. A year later, in 2014, Lucero signed for Colegiales, another of his ex-teams. He made his Primera B Metropolitana debut on 9 August in a loss against Tristán Suárez. On 19 August 2016, Lucero completed a loan to Argentine Primera División side Banfield.

His first Argentine top-flight appearance came in October 2016 against Defensa y Justicia. Lucero returned to Colegiales in June 2018, but was immediately loaned back out to join Chacarita Juniors. He remained until December 2019, though spent the final five months there injured. In early 2020, Lucero moved to Chile with Primera B's Deportes Copiapó. He never made a competitive appearance for them due to the COVID-19 pandemic, though was an unused substitute on 13 March for a league match with Deportes Puerto Montt. September 2020 saw Lucero rejoin Colegiales.

Career statistics
.

References

External links

1990 births
Living people
Footballers from Buenos Aires
Argentine footballers
Association football midfielders
Argentine expatriate footballers
Expatriate footballers in Brazil
Expatriate footballers in Chile
Argentine expatriate sportspeople in Brazil
Argentine expatriate sportspeople in Chile
Campeonato Brasileiro Série B players
Primera B Metropolitana players
Argentine Primera División players
Primera Nacional players
Figueirense FC players
Esporte Clube Pelotas players
Sociedade Esportiva Palmeiras players
Grêmio Barueri Futebol players
Clube Atlético Sorocaba players
Sportivo Belgrano footballers
Club Atlético Colegiales (Argentina) players
Club Atlético Banfield footballers
Chacarita Juniors footballers
Deportes Copiapó footballers